Pynthorumkhrah is one of the 60 Legislative Assembly constituencies of Meghalaya state in India. It is part of East Khasi Hills district and a part of Shillong (Lok Sabha constituency).

Members of Legislative Assembly
The list of MLAs are given below

|-style="background:#E9E9E9;"
!Year
!align="center" |Name
!colspan="2" align="center"|Party
|-
|1978
|rowspan=2| B. K. Roy
|
|-
|1983
|-
|1988
|rowspan=2| James Marvan Pariat
|
|-
|1993
|
|-
|1998
|rowspan=6| Alexander Laloo Hek
|
|-
|2003
|-
|2008
|-
|2013
|
|-
|2018
|
|-
|2023
|-
|}

Election results

2018

See also
List of constituencies of the Meghalaya Legislative Assembly
 Pynthorumkhrah
 East Khasi Hills district
 Shillong (Lok Sabha constituency)

References

Assembly constituencies of Meghalaya
East Khasi Hills district